Roja Selvamani (born Sri Latha Reddy; 17 November 1972), also known as R. K. Roja or Lady Roja Selvamani, is an Indian politician and former actress. She is serving as the current Minister for Tourism, Culture and Youth Advancement of Andhra Pradesh. She was a leading actress in Tamil and Telugu films from 1991 to 2002. She has also acted in a few Kannada and Malayalam-language films. She won three Nandi Awards and one Tamil Nadu State Film Award.

Roja began her political career in 1998 from the Telugu Desam Party and aligns with the YSR Congress Party since 2011. She was elected as an MLA from Nagari in Andhra Pradesh twice in the 2014 and 2019. She also serves as the YSR Congress Party's state women president. Between 2019 and 2021, Roja served as the chairperson of APIIC Andhra Pradesh. In 2022, Roja announced she would be leaving the film industry to focus more on her political career as a politician. She also announced that she will no longer be acting in any films. Roja is married to Tamil film director R. K. Selvamani.

Early life
Roja was born as Sri Latha Reddy on 17 November 1974 to Nagaraja Reddy and Lalitha in Tirupati, Tirupati district, Andhra Pradesh. She was the only girl with two brothers Kumaraswamy Reddy and Ramaprasad Reddy. Later, the family moved to Hyderabad. She got her bachelor's degree in Political Science from Sri Padmavathi Women's University, Tirupati. Roja learnt Kuchipudi and was performing in dance before she entered films.

Career

Film career
Roja entered the film industry with Telugu films. Her first movie was Prema Thapassu with Rajendra Prasad where the complete movie was shot in Tirupati.

She was introduced to the Tamil film industry by director R. K. Selvamani with Chembaruthi, along with actor Prashanth. The movie was a hit and paved way for role in another success, Suriyan with Sarath Kumar. Both the films established her in Tamil cinema. She became known for songs such as "Meloor Maman" in the film Makkal Aatchi with Mammootty and "Mastana Mastana" in Raasaiyya with Prabhu Deva. Her performance in films with actors such as Rajinikanth in Veera, Arjun Sarja in Ayudha Poojai and Prabhu in Thirupathi Ezhumalai Venkatesa were praised. Roja's major career breakthrough was in the film Unnidathil Ennai Koduthen, directed by Vikraman. In Telugu, she appeared in successful movies like Mutha Mestri, Mugguru Monagallu, Bhairava Dweepam, Bobbili Simham, Annamayya, Anna, Peddannayya, Kshemamga Velli Labhamga Randi, Subhalagnam, Sri Krishnarjuna Vijayam and Kalavida. Her 100th movie was Pottu Amman. Roja later appeared in supporting roles in films like Arasu (2003), Parijatham (2006), Shambo Shiva Shambo (2010), Golimar (2010), Mogudu (2011), Kodipunju (2011), Veera (2011), Kaavalan (2011) and Saguni (2012).

Political career
Roja joined Telugu Desam in 1999 and was the president of the Telugu Mahila wing of the Party. She lost the 2009 AP State Elections. In August 2009, she quit TDP and joined YSR Congress Party when the party was established. In 2014 general elections, she won as an MLA from Nagari assembly constituency. She contested once again from Nagari assembly constituency in 2019 election. The results are announced and she won the seat again. She was appointed Chairperson of APIIC in 2020.

Despite Roja being an active speaker among women MLA's she was suspended from attending the legislative assembly for one year. The decision was taken by majority in the legislative house, on 18 December 2015, and by the approval of the Speaker. Y. S. Jagan Mohan Reddy, leader of the opposition, opposed the suspension. There were several concerns on the procedure followed while suspending Roja. Such doubts made the opposition to move no-trust motion against the speaker. An issue was raised by the opposition party on how the media clipping, property of the house, released and published on social media without the speaker's approval and the speaker also noted their concern and set up an inquiry to probe the issue further and submit a report by next meeting.

Other work
Roja played anchor in a show named Modern Mahalakshmi before getting replaced by Anasuya. This show was telecasted on MAA TV. She is one of the judges for the comedy shows Jabardasth and Extra Jabardasth. This show telecasts on E TV. She hosted one show for Zee Tamizh called lucka kicka, which was a huge hit in Tamil Nadu.

Personal life
Roja married Tamil film director R. K. Selvamani on 21 August 2002. The couple have a daughter and a son.

Roja had a penchant for hairdressing and it was evident as whenever she was on the sets she was seen hairdressing her peers like Devayani, Khushbu, Ranjitha and Mumtaz to name a few. According to Ramya Krishna, her friend and co-star, Roja is one of the few artists who can do their makeup themselves. Actress Mumtaz in an interview praised Roja's willingness and egoless attitude when she did her hair and make-up during a Singapore Film Show in 2003.

Filmography

Tamil cinema

Telugu cinema

Kannada cinema

Malayalam cinema

Television

Political statistics

Awards 
Nandi Awards
 Special Jury Award – Sarpayagam (1991)
 Best Supporting Actress – Anna (1994) 
 Best Actress – Swarnakka (1998)

Tamil Nadu State Film Awards 
 1998 –  Tamil Nadu State Film Award for Best Actress – Unnidathil Ennai Koduthen
Cinema Express Awards
 1998 –  Cinema Express Award for Best Actress – Tamil – Unnidathil Ennai Koduthen
Filmfare Award South 
 2010 – Nominated – Filmfare Award for Best Supporting Actress – Telugu – Golimaar

References

External links
 

Actresses from Andhra Pradesh
Actresses in Tamil cinema
Actresses in Kannada cinema
Actresses in Telugu cinema
Indian film actresses
Telugu actresses
Living people
1972 births
Actresses in Malayalam cinema
Telugu Desam Party politicians
YSR Congress Party politicians
Tamil Nadu State Film Awards winners
Nandi Award winners
People from Tirupati
Women members of the Andhra Pradesh Legislative Assembly
Indian actor-politicians
Andhra Pradesh MLAs 2014–2019
Andhra Pradesh MLAs 2019–2024
21st-century Indian women politicians
21st-century Indian politicians
20th-century Indian actresses
21st-century Indian actresses
Indian television actresses
Actresses in Telugu television
Actresses in Kannada television
Actresses in Tamil television